Licenciado Miguel de la Madrid National Airport, also known as Colima Airport, is an airport in Colima, Colima, Mexico. It is operated by Aeropuertos y Servicios Auxiliares, a federal government-owned corporation. The airport is named after Miguel de la Madrid, the former President of Mexico (1982–88), who was born in the state.

Information
In 2021, the airport handled 143,774 passengers, and in 2022 it handled 169,516 passengers.

The airport has one terminal with one concourse.

Airlines and destinations

Statistics

Passengers

Gallery

See also 

 List of the busiest airports in Mexico

References

External links
 Colima Airport

Airports in Colima
Colima City